Carol Martin may refer to:
 Carol Martin (politician) (born 1957), Australian politician
 Carol Martin (athlete) (born 1948), track-and-field athlete
 Carol Martin (journalist), American journalist and news anchor
 C. Dianne Martin, American computer scientist
 Carol Vance Martin, alter-ego of DC Comic character Wildfire